Addyston is a village in Miami Township, Hamilton County, Ohio, United States, along the Ohio River.  The population was 927 at the 2020 census.

The village was named after Matthew Addy, the proprietor of a local factory.

Geography
Addyston is located at  (39.138292, -84.713204).

Demographics

2010 census
As of the census of 2010, there were 938 people, 372 households, and 228 families living in the village. The racial makeup of the village was 89.7% White, 5.7% African American, 0.2% Native American, 0.2% Asian, 0.1% from other races, and 4.2% from two or more races. Hispanic or Latino of any race were 1.9% of the population.

There were 372 households, of which 33.6% had children under the age of 18 living with them, 33.6% were married couples living together, 20.7% had a female householder with no husband present, 7.0% had a male householder with no wife present, and 38.7% were non-families. 29.6% of all households were made up of individuals, and 10% had someone living alone who was 65 years of age or older. The average household size was 2.52 and the average family size was 3.15.

The median age in the village was 34.2 years. 25.3% of residents were under the age of 18; 11.5% were between the ages of 18 and 24; 27% were from 25 to 44; 26.1% were from 45 to 64; and 10.2% were 65 years of age or older. The gender makeup of the village was 50.5% male and 49.5% female.

2000 census
As of the census of 2000, there were 1,010 people, 365 households, and 269 families living in the village.  The population density was 1,165.1 people per square mile (448.2/km).  There were 408 housing units at an average density of 470.7 per square mile (181.1/km).  The racial makeup of the village was 87.82% White, 8.42% African American, 0.50% Native American, 0.40% Asian, 1.09% from other races, and 1.78% from two or more races. Hispanic or Latino of any race were 1.78% of the population.

There were 365 households, out of which 40.5% had children under the age of 18 living with them, 44.1% were married couples living together, 24.1% had a female householder with no husband present, and 26.3% were non-families. 24.1% of all households were made up of individuals, and 7.1% had someone living alone who was 65 years of age or older.  The average household size was 2.77 and the average family size was 3.22.

In the village, the population was spread out, with 31.7% under the age of 18, 8.8% from 18 to 24, 31.4% from 25 to 44, 18.0% from 45 to 64, and 10.1% who were 65 years of age or older.  The median age was 31 years. For every 100 females, there were 98.0 males.  For every 100 females age 18 and over, there were 92.2 males.

The median income for a household in the village was $33,000, and the median income for a family was $34,808. Males had a median income of $29,583 versus $25,536 for females. The per capita income for the village was $13,266.  About 9.2% of families and 11.6% of the population were below the poverty line, including 14.4% of those under age 18 and 14.8% of those age 65 or over.

See also
 List of cities and towns along the Ohio River

References

External links
 Village website

Villages in Hamilton County, Ohio
Villages in Ohio
Populated places established in 1891
Ohio populated places on the Ohio River
1891 establishments in Ohio